Topolica Sport Hall is a multi-purpose indoor, modern arena located in the city of Bar, Montenegro. It is the home ground of basketball club Mornar and has a capacity of 2,625 spectators.
On the ground floor of this two-storey hall there is a field suitable for basketball, handball, volleyball and regular indoor sports. Its area is 1,290 m2, capacity 2,625 spectators. In addition to the mentioned court, the hall also has a space intended for recreational table tennis, a gym of 490 m2, six locker rooms, a locker room for judges, a press center equipped with a complete projection and audio system, a conference room with a capacity of about 50 seats and a VIP lounge. The hall is surrounded by a pedestrian platform with landscaped green areas, as well as a parking space with 700 seats. A parking space for buses, police cars and ambulances has also been provided. It also has technical accessibility standards that ensure the unimpeded movement of children, the elderly, people with reduced mobility and people with disabilities, as well as any modern facility intended for holding various events.

History
The arena was officially opened on November 23, 2009.

Indoor arenas in Montenegro
Basketball venues in Montenegro
Buildings and structures in Bar, Montenegro
Handball venues in Montenegro
Sport in Bar, Montenegro